Carolyn Seymour is an English actress, best known for portraying the role of Abby Grant in the BBC series Survivors (1975), and Queen Myrrah in the Gears of War franchise.

Career
Born Carolyn von Benckendorf in Buckinghamshire to an Estonian father of Russian descent and an Irish mother. One of her early television roles was as Jenny in the BBC drama series Take Three Girls. and an early film appearance was as Zita in the film Steptoe and Son (1972) alongside Harry H. Corbett and Wilfrid Brambell. Her best-known movie role remains Grace Gurney in The Ruling Class (also 1972), opposite Peter O'Toole.

She left Survivors at the end of its first series due to disagreements with the producers over the direction the show and her character were taking. She appeared in the Space: 1999 episode "The Seance Spectre", and with Joan Collins in The Bitch (1979). She then moved to the United States and made numerous television appearances including Hart to Hart, Modesty Blaise, Family Ties, Cagney & Lacey, Remington Steele, Magnum, P.I., The Twilight Zone, Murder, She Wrote, Matlock, Quantum Leap; Star Trek: The Next Generation, Civil Wars, L.A. Law, Red Shoe Diaries,  Star Trek: Voyager, and ER.

She has contributed voice work for several Star Wars video games, portraying characters such as Shmi Skywalker and Mon Mothma. She provides the voice for the Locust Queen Myrrah in Gears of War, Dr. Karin Chakwas in the Mass Effect series and the Elder God of Water in Mortal Kombat Annihilation. She has played in audio plays by L.A. Theatre Works and The Hollywood Theater of the Ear as well as narrated audiobooks.

In 2014, she reprised the role of Abby Grant in Big Finish Productions' Survivors series, based on the book by Terry Nation and the television series. She has also gone on to play various other roles for the company and in April 2021, they released a career resprospecitve interview with her entitled Carolyn Seymour in Conversation.

Since 2014, she has voiced Bierce in Dark Deception.

Personal life
Seymour married director Peter Medak in 1973. The couple had two children and divorced in 1984.

Since 2011, she has lived in Chalais, France.

Filmography

Film

Television

Video games

References

External links
 
 
 Interview with Seymour, survivorstvseries.com; accessed March 3, 2015.

1947 births
Living people
English people of Russian descent
English people of Irish descent
English television actresses
English film actresses
English video game actresses
English expatriates in the United States
People from Aylesbury